Polyhymno blastophora is a moth of the family Gelechiidae. It was described by Anthonie Johannes Theodorus Janse in 1950. It is found in Namibia.

References

Moths described in 1950
Polyhymno